{{Infobox person
| name        = Chief Yowlachie
| image       = Gary Gray-Chief Yowlachie in The Painted Hills.jpg
| caption     = Chief Yowlachie (right) with Gary Gray in a promotional poster for the 1951 film The Painted Hills
| birth_name  =
| birth_date  = August 15, 1890
| birth_place = Yakima, Washington, U.S.
| death_date  = 
| death_place = Los Angeles, California, U.S.
| death_cause =
| resting_place = Valhalla Memorial Park Cemetery in North Hollywood, California
| other_names =Daniel Simmons (birth name)
| known_for   =
| education   =
| employer    =
| occupation  =Actor, opera singer
| title       =
| height      =
| term        =
| predecessor =
| successor   =
| party       =
| boards      =
| spouse      = Lillian Simmons
| partner     =
| children    =
| parents     =
| relatives   =
| signature   =
| website     =
| footnotes   =
| nationality = Native American
}}
Chief Yowlachie  (August 15, 1890 – March 7, 1966), also known as Daniel Simmons; was a Native American actor from the Yakama tribe in the U.S. state of Washington, known for playing supporting roles and bit parts in numerous films. He is perhaps best known for playing Two Jaw Quo, Nadine Groot's assistant cook, in the classic 1948 Western Red River.

Biography

On August 15, 1890, Yowlachie was born on the Yakima Indian Reservation in Washington. He was educated at the Government Indian Trade School.

From 1925 through 1930, Yowlachie made 12 films, 11 of which were Westerns. In his film debut, he played the title role in Tonio, Son of the Sierras (1925).

A Bass-baritone, Yowlachie studied opera under Pasquale Amato and sang on radio and on stage (including performing with the Los Angeles Philharmonic Orchestra) from 1931 through 1939. He sang at the White House on separate occasions for Herbert Hoover and Franklin Roosevelt. His other performances included singing at the Pacific Southwest Exposition in Long Beach, California, in 1928 and the dedication of Griffith Park's Greek Theatre in 1930. He also performed in programs at the Southwest Museum of the American Indian in Los Angeles.

Yowlachie resumed his film career in 1940, making 32 Westerns and two serials through 1955. His roles included Quo in Red River (1948) and Geronimo in the serial Son of Geronimo: Apache Avenger (1952). Despite his musical background, Yowlachie never sang in films in which he acted. The closest he came to singing on-screen was when his voice was used in a recorded prologue to a 1926 silent film.

Some of his television appearances include "War Horse", an episode of The Lone Ranger and "Rope of Lies", an episode of The Virginian. He appeared twice on The Range Rider. He appeared as the Apache Geronimo in the 1950s syndicated television series Stories of the Century.In 1962, Chief Yowlachie played "The Great Chief" in the episode "The Black Robe" of NBC's western series The Tall Man.

On March 7, 1966, Yowlachie died in Los Angeles, California, following a stroke. His funeral included "an Indian death chant and ritual". He is buried in Valhalla Memorial Park Cemetery in North Hollywood, California. At the time of his death, he was married to Lillian Simmons.

Selected filmographyKentucky Days (1923) - Indian Scout
 Tonio, Son of the Sierras (1925) - TonioElla Cinders (1926) - Indian (uncredited)Moran of the Mounted (1926) - Biting WolfThe Scarlet Letter (1926) - Indian (uncredited)Forlorn River (1926) - Modoc JoeWar Paint (1926) - Iron EyesSitting Bull at the Spirit Lake Massacre (1927) - Chief Sitting BullHawk of the Hills (1927, Serial) - Chief Long HandThe Red Raiders (1927) - Lone WolfThe Glorious Trail (1928) - High WolfHawk of the Hills (1929) - Chief White WolfThe Invaders (1929)Tiger Rose (1929) - Indian (uncredited)The Santa Fe Trail (1930) - Brown BeaverThe Girl of the Golden West (1930) - Billy JackrabbitThe Thundering Herd (1933) - Indian (uncredited)Man of Conquest (1939) - Cherokee Tribesman (uncredited)Flash Gordon Conquers the Universe (1940, Serial) - King of the Rock People [Chs. 7-9] (uncredited)Winners of the West (1940, Serial) - Chief War Eagle [Chs. 1, 5, 7, 9-10, 13]North West Mounted Police (1940) - Indian (uncredited)White Eagle (1941, Serial) - Chief Running DeerThe Round Up (1941) - Chief Blackhawk (uncredited)Saddlemates (1941) - Council Chief (uncredited)This Woman Is Mine (1941) - Chief One-Eye Comcomly (uncredited)Outlaws of Cherokee Trail (1941) - Indian Poker Player (uncredited)Ride 'Em Cowboy (1942) - Chief Tomahawk (uncredited)King of the Stallions (1942) - Chief MatapotanDawn on the Great Divide (1942) - Indian (uncredited)Frontier Fury (1943) - Nuyaka (uncredited)Canyon Passage (1946) - Indian Spokesman (uncredited)The Strange Woman (1946) - Indian Guide (uncredited)Wild West (1946) - Chief Black FoxSingin' in the Corn (1946) - Indian (uncredited)Oregon Trail Scouts (1947) - Indian (uncredited)The Hucksters (1947) - Indian (uncredited)Bowery Buckaroos (1947) - Big Chief Hi-OctaneThe Prairie (1947) - MatoreehThe Senator Was Indiscreet (1947) - IndianThe Gallant Legion (1948) - Indian Medicine Man (uncredited)The Dude Goes West (1948) - Running WolfRed River (1948) - QuoYou Gotta Stay Happy (1948) - Indian (uncredited)The Paleface (1948) - Chief Yellow FeatherYellow Sky (1948) - Colorado (uncredited)El Paso (1949) - Paiute Pete (uncredited)Ma and Pa Kettle (1949) - CrowbarTulsa (1949) - Charlie Lightfoot (uncredited)Canadian Pacific (1949) - Indian Chief (uncredited)The Cowboy and the Indians (1949) - Chief Long Arrow (uncredited)My Friend Irma (1949) - Indian (uncredited)Mrs. Mike (1949) - AtenouThe Traveling Saleswoman (1950) - Sam (uncredited)Young Daniel Boone (1950) - Indian Guide (uncredited)Ma and Pa Kettle Go to Town (1950) - Crowbar (uncredited)A Ticket to Tomahawk (1950) - PawneeKill the Umpire (1950) - Indian (uncredited)Annie Get Your Gun (1950) - Little Horse (uncredited)Winchester '73 (1950) - Indian at Rifle Shoot (uncredited)My Friend Irma Goes West (1950) - Hiawatha - Indian Chief (uncredited)Indian Territory (1950) - Indian Chief (uncredited)Cherokee Uprising (1950) - Gray EagleThe Last Outpost (1951) - Cochise (uncredited)The Painted Hills (1951) - Bald EagleCavalry Scout (1951) - Indian Chief (uncredited)Warpath (1951) - ChiefLone Star (1952) - Mangas Colorado (uncredited)Buffalo Bill in Tomahawk Territory (1952) - Chief White CloudThe Half-Breed (1952) - Apache Chief (uncredited)Son of Geronimo: Apache Avenger (1952, Serial) - Geronimo [ch 15]Thunderbirds (1952) - Chief Whitedeer (uncredited)The Pathfinder (1952) - Eagle FeatherRose Marie (1954) - Black EagleGunfighters of the Northwest (1954, Serial) - Chief Running ElkDrums Across the River (1954) - Medicine Man (uncredited)The Wild Dakotas (1956) - Indian (uncredited)Hollywood or Bust (1956) - Chief Running Water (uncredited)The Spirit of St. Louis (1957) - Indian (uncredited)The Buccaneer (1958) - Choctaw Indian (uncredited)The FBI Story (1959) - Harry Willowtree (uncredited)Yellowstone Kelly (1959) - Medicine Man (uncredited)Heller in Pink Tights (1960) - Indian (uncredited)Nevada Smith'' (1966) - Medicine Man (uncredited) (final film role)

References

External links

 
 

1890 births
1966 deaths
20th-century American male actors
20th-century Native Americans
Burials at Valhalla Memorial Park Cemetery
Male actors from Washington (state)
Native American male actors
Native American actors
People from Yakima, Washington
Yakama
American male film actors
American male television actors
Film serial actors
Male Western (genre) film actors
Western (genre) television actors